Brunswick was launched at Newcastle in 1795. She made one voyage as an "extra ship", i.e., under charter, to the British East India Company (EIC). She then traded generally until she foundered in 1809.

Career
Brunswick enters Lloyd's Register in 1795 with G. Ryland, master, Hurry & Co., owners, and trade London–India. Captain George Ryland acquired a letter of marque on 3 September 1795.

Captain Ryland sailed from The Downs on 23 September 1795. Brunswick reached Calcutta on 12 April 1796. Homeward bound, she was at Saugor on 28 July, reached St Helena on 22 November, and arrived at Long Reach on 17 February 1797. 

On her return from India Hurry & Co. sold Brunswick and she became a West Indiaman.

On 1 May 1804 Lloyd's List reported that Brunswick, Drysdale, master, had had to put back to Portsmouth having lost her mainmast and having suffered other damage. The convoy was under the escort of the brig .

Fate 
The Register of Shipping for 1810 shows Brunswick with Simpson, master, Penton & Co., owners, and trade London transport. 

Brunswick, Simpson, master, foundered in the Grand Banks of Newfoundland on either 21 or 27 July 1809 (sources disagree) while sailing from London to Quebec. Her crew were rescued.

Notes

Citations

References
 
 
  

1795 ships
Ships built on the River Tyne
Ships of the British East India Company
Age of Sail merchant ships of England
Maritime incidents in 1809